Onufry Kopczyński (30 November 1736 – 14 February 1817) was an important educator and grammarian of the Polish language during the Polish Enlightenment.

Life and work
Born in Czerniejewo near Gniezno, Kopczyński became an educator with the Piarist order, teaching at  Stanisław Konarski's Collegium Nobilium in Warsaw. In 1775 he became a member of the Society for Elementary Textbooks, and in 1809 visitor to the Prussian-Polish schools.

Kopczyński is best known for his efforts to improve the status of the Polish language by making it a principal subject of study in schools. He in fact created Polish grammar terminology. His major work was Gramatyka dla szkół narodowych (A Grammar for the National Schools, 1785), in which he laid out a formal grammar and method of study for the Latin and Polish languages. The part of the book relating to the Polish language would be reprinted many times in the first half of the 19th century.

Selected publications
 Essai de Grammaire Polonaise pratique et raisonnée pour les Français l'an 1807 
 Grammatyka języka Polskiego ... Dziéło pozgonné 
 Poprawa błędów w ustnéy i pisanéy mowie polskiéy, Warszawa 1808
 Grammatyka dla szkoł narodowych, 1780–1807  
 Układ grammatyki dla szkół narodowych z dzieła iuż skończonego wyciagniony, 1785

See also
List of Poles
Translation

Notes

 

Grammarians from Poland
Polish translation scholars
Polish Roman Catholic priests
Piarists
1736 births
1817 deaths
People from Gniezno County